Serrano Point is an ice-free point on the northwest coast of Discovery Bay, Greenwich Island in the South Shetland Islands, Antarctica named by the 1947 Chilean Antarctic Expedition after First Lieutenant Fernando Serrano, doctor on the expedition frigate Iquique.

Location

Maps
 L.L. Ivanov et al. Antarctica: Livingston Island and Greenwich Island, South Shetland Islands. Scale 1:100000 topographic map. Sofia: Antarctic Place-names Commission of Bulgaria, 2005.
 L.L. Ivanov. Antarctica: Livingston Island and Greenwich, Robert, Snow and Smith Islands. Scale 1:120000 topographic map.  Troyan: Manfred Wörner Foundation, 2009.

References
 SCAR Composite Antarctic Gazetteer.

Headlands of Greenwich Island